Stanko or Stańko is a variation of the Slavic masculine given name Stanislav. Notable people with the name include:

Given name:
Stanko Abadžić (born 1952), Croatian photographer and photojournalist
Stanko Barać (born 1986), Croatian professional basketball player
Stanko Bloudek (1890–1959), Slovenian aeroplane and automobile designer, sportsman and sport inventor, designer, builder and educator
Stanko Bubalo (born 1973), Croatian football striker
Stanko Crnojević (1457–1528), Serbian lord and Ottoman vassal
Stanko Karaman (1889–1959), researcher on amphipods and isopods
Stanko Kotnik (1928–2004), Slovene professor of Slavic studies at the University of Maribor
Stanko Lorger (1931–2014), Slovenian former hurdler and Olympic competitor
Stanko Mladenovski (born 1937), Macedonian politician
Stanko Mršić (born 1955), Croatian football manager and a former player
Stanko Poklepović (born 1938), Croatian football coach
Stanko Prek (1915–1999), classical guitarist and composer from Slovenia
Stanko Premrl (1880–1965), Slovenian Roman Catholic priest, composer and music teacher
Stanko Subotić (born 1959), Geneva-based Serbian businessman
Stanko Svitlica, retired Serbian football player
Stanko Tavčar (1898–1945), Slovenian footballer and later a medical doctor
Stanko Todorov (1920–1996), Bulgarian communist politician
Stanko Vraz (born Jakob Frass) (1810–1851), Croatian-Slovenian poet
Stanko Yovchev (born 1988), Bulgarian footballer

Surname:
Ewa Grajkowska-Stańko (born 1948), Polish sprint canoeist who competed in the early 1970s
Stephen Stanko (born 1968), convicted murderer, who killed two people and raped a teenage girl in South Carolina in 2005
Tomasz Stańko (1942–2018), Polish jazz trumpeter, composer, and improviser
Zvezdelina Stankova (born 1969), Bulgarian-US mathematician

See also
 
Stanco
Stanko Mlakar Stadium (Slovene: Štadion Stanka Mlakarja) is a multi-purpose stadium in Kranj, Slovenia
Stankovce
Stankovci
Stanković
Stankovo (disambiguation)
Stankowo (disambiguation)

Slavic masculine given names
Bulgarian masculine given names
Croatian masculine given names
Serbian masculine given names
Slovene masculine given names